The Taiharuru River is a river of the Northland Region of New Zealand's North Island. It flows predominantly northeast from its sources east of Whangarei, emptying into the southern end of Ngunguru Bay. About half of the river's length is a silty drowned valley.

See also
List of rivers of New Zealand

References

Rivers of the Northland Region
Rivers of New Zealand